David Ramirez is an American film and television editor. Ramirez is best known for such films and television series as American Pop, New York, New York, Star Trek: Deep Space Nine, and Still Smokin.

He was an associate film editor on The Blues Brothers, and assistant editor on Cabaret.

References

External links

Living people
Year of birth missing (living people)
American film editors